18 Squadron or 18th Squadron may refer to:

 No. 18 (Netherlands East Indies) Squadron RAAF, a unit of the Royal Australian Air Force
 No. 18 Squadron IAF, a unit of the Indian Air Force
 No. 18 Squadron RAF, a  unit of the United Kingdom Royal Air Force
 18th Squadron (Observation), a unit of the United States Army Air Service
 18th Aggressor Squadron, a unit of the United States Air Force
 18th Combat Mapping Squadron, a unit of the United States Army Air Force
 18th Intelligence Squadron, a unit of the United States Air Force
 18th Flight Test Squadron, a unit of the United States Air Force
 18th Reconnaissance Squadron, a unit of the United States Air Force
 18th Space Defense Squadron, a unit of the United States Space Force
 Marine Wing Communications Squadron 18, a unit of the United States Marine Corps
 Marine Tactical Air Command Squadron 18, a unit of the United States Marine Corps

See also
 XVIII Corps (disambiguation)
 18th Division (disambiguation)
 18th Brigade (disambiguation)
 18th Regiment (disambiguation)
 18th Battalion (disambiguation)